The Coquille class (or Patriote-class) was a type of five 40-gun frigates designed by Raymond-Antoine Haran.

 Coquille
Builder: 
Ordered: 
Launched: 
Fate:

 Sirène
Builder: 
Ordered: 
Launched: 
Fate:

 Franchise
Builder: 
Ordered: 
Launched: 
Fate:

 Dédaigneuse
Builder: 
Ordered: 
Launched: 
Fate:

 Thémis
Builder: 
Ordered: 
Launched: 
Fate:

 
Frigate classes